Motlow State Community College is a public community college with multiple locations in southern Middle Tennessee. The main campus opened its facilities in 1969 and is located in Moore County on 187 acres of land donated by the late Senator Reagor Motlow and family. Motlow College also has learning centers in Fayetteville, McMinnville and Smyrna, a teaching site in Sparta and a partnership in Shelbyville at the Middle Tennessee Education Center.

The college residents in an 11-county service area including Bedford, Cannon, Coffee, DeKalb, Franklin, Lincoln, Moore, Rutherford, Van Buren, Warren, and White. The college also allows residents of three border counties in Alabama to pay in-state tuition: Madison, Jackson, and Limestone counties.

Motlow participates in baseball, softball, and men's and women's basketball, and women's soccer as part of the Tennessee Community College Athletic Association and the National Junior College Athletic Association.

History
The Motlow family donated  of land on which the college is built in Moore County, Tennessee; subsequently, the college bears the family name—Motlow College.

Presidents
 Sam Ingram (president 1968-1975)
 Harry Wagner (president 1975-1986)
 Wade Powers (interim president 1986-1987)
 A. Frank Glass (president 1987-2003)
 Arthur L. Walker, Jr. (president 2003-2006)
 MaryLou Apple (president 2006-2015)
 Anthony Kinkel (president 2015-2017)
 Hilda Tunstill (interim president 2017)
 Michael L. Torrence (president 2018-present)

Accreditations & Endorsements

 Motlow is accredited by the Commission on Colleges of the Southern Association of Colleges and Schools to award the Level 1 associate degree.
 In 2023, the ARM Institute endorsed Motlow State's mechatronics program. ARM Endorsements recognize the most effective training programs for robotics careers in manufacturing in the United States.

Notable alumni
 Bryan Morris, professional baseball pitcher for the Miami Marlins of Major League Baseball

References

External links
 Official website
 Official athletics website

 
1969 establishments in Tennessee
Community colleges in Tennessee
Lynchburg, Tennessee
Education in Moore County, Tennessee
NJCAA athletics
Buildings and structures in Moore County, Tennessee